The 1999 World Series of Poker (WSOP) was a series of poker tournaments held at Binion's Horseshoe.

Preliminary events

Main Event
There were 393 entrants to the main event. Each paid $10,000 to enter the tournament. At the 1999 Main Event final table, Huck Seed was attempting to become a two-time World Champion. His attempt fell short as he was eliminated in sixth place.

Final table

*Career statistics prior to the beginning of the 1999 Main Event.

Final table results

Other High Finishes
NB: This list is restricted to top 30 finishers with an existing Wikipedia entry.

External links
1999 World Series of Poker at Conjelco.com

World Series of Poker
World Series of Poker